The 2009 Women's African Volleyball Championship was held in Blida, Algeria, from October 3 to October 8, 2009.

Results

|}

Standings

|}

External links
 Results

2009
African championship
Women's Volleyball Championship
Women's Volleyball Championship
International volleyball competitions hosted by Algeria